Tunisia has competed at every celebration of the Mediterranean Games since the 1959 Mediterranean Games. As of 2022 Mediterranean Games, Tunisian athletes have won a total of 349 medals.

Medal tables

Medals by Mediterranean Games

Below the table representing all Tunisian medals around the games. Till now, Tunisia won 349 medals where 89 of them are gold.

Medals by sport

Athletes with most medals 
The Tunisian athlete who won the most medals in the history of the Mediterranean Games, by swimmer Oussama Mellouli.

Notes: in Khaki the athletes still in activity.

Medal account by gender

See also
 Tunisia at the Olympics
 Tunisia at the All-Africa Games
 Tunisia at the Pan Arab Games
 Tunisia at the Paralympics
 Sports in Tunisia

References

External links 
 Official website